Rose Bay is a community in the Canadian province of Nova Scotia, in Lunenburg County.

Notable people 
 Ines Torelli (1931-2019), Swiss actress

References

External links
Kingsburg Nova Scotia Community Association
Kingsburg Coastal Conservancy
Municipality of the District of Lunenburg

Communities in Lunenburg County, Nova Scotia
General Service Areas in Nova Scotia